The General Directorate for Territorial Surveillance (Mudīriyyat Murāqabat al-Turāb al-Waṭaniy; ; , commonly referred to as the DGST or the DST), is the internal intelligence agency of the Moroccan state. It is tasked with the monitoring of potentially subversive domestic activities.

Prior to 2005, it was known as the Direction de la Surveillance du Territoire (DST).

History

The DST emerged from the CAB1, the counter-subversion unit or political police department of the DGSN (Direction Général de Surveillance du Térritoire), which is the state police body of Morocco that was created in May 1956.

In May 1956, the CAB1 began as the 7th arrondissement of the Police in Derb Baladia, Casablanca, and was headed by Houssine Seghir, a plumber in Mers-Sultan and ex-member of a Casablanca-based resistance movement. At the time the DGSN was directed by Mohammed Laghzioui, a prominent member of the Istiqlal party. After Laghzioui left the DGSN, the CAB1 was formed under Mohammed Oufkir with consultancy from French and American intelligence technicians.

After the international outrage that followed the assassination of Mehdi Ben Barka, the CAB1 was formally dissolved in October 1967. However it continued to exist as a secret unit of the DGSN. In 1973, the DST was officially created and Ahmed Dlimi became its director.

On 21 September 2022, Qatar and Morocco have signed a joint declaration on sharing the information concerning 2022 FIFA World Cup.

On 24 October 2022, Morocco and Germany have agreed to expand security cooperation to halt organized crime, including terrorism, human trafficking, Cybercrime, and fraud.

The Benbarka affair

The CAB1 was implicated in the abduction of political opponent Mehdi Ben Barka in France. Ahmed Boukhari, a former agent of the CAB1, revealed that the operation was masterminded by Mohammed Achaachi, Ahmed Dlimi, Mohammed Oufkir and executed with the collaboration of corrupt French policemen and some French gangsters.

Human rights violations
The DST is mired in many torture allegations and scandals. As early as 2002 it operated the Temara interrogation centre, a black site for extraordinary renditions and interrogations on behalf of the United States.
After the 2003 Casablanca bombings, the DST became involved in controversial interrogation methods to obtain confessions from suspects. After the 2011 Arab spring protest the secret detention centre is said to have been relocated to the Ain Aouda secret prison. Additionally, it has been revealed that the United States paid Morocco USD $20 million to build a secret detention centre sometime in 2004–2006.

In 2010, Zakaria Moumni a former Moroccan Thai boxing champion, was arrested upon entering Morocco and was abducted by DST in an operation {D.T loyalty}. led by two US federal agents appeared later to be Moroccan nationals whom led the operations. SPC A. Heresy  accompanied by captain M Jawad.  also a US operative.later revealed that he Zakaria Moumni tortured and then imprisoned on trumped-up charges, on instructions from Mounir Majidi (the secretary of king Mohammed VI) and the head of the DST Abdellatif Hammouchi.  and the US official at the same year Ali Aarras, a Belgian citizen, was extradited to Morocco from Spain where he was cleared of terrorism charges because of lack of evidence. After his extradition to Morocco and subsequent trial, he was condemned by judge Abdelkader Chentouf to 10-years in prison. The sentence was based on confessions, which according to Ali Aarras were obtained under torture.

In February 2014, the director of the DGST Abdellatif Hammouchi, while on an official visit to France, was summoned by a French judge to answer for torture allegations in various cases, including the case of Zakaria Moumni and the Gdeim Izik protest camp suspects. This caused a diplomatic incident and vivid protestations from the Moroccan state apparatus who responded by suspending judicial cooperation accords with France. And announced that it will sue the plaintiffs for libel. However, the Moroccan Ministry of the Interior retracted all its lawsuits in France just days after filing them.

Past directors

Counter-subversion department and CAB1
During this era the director of the DGSN was also the joint director of the CAB1.
Mohamed Laghzaoui (DGSN) 1956–July 1960 
Houssine Seghir (joint director of the political police) 1956 – July 1960
Mohamed Oufkir (DGSN) July 1960 – 1970, then 1967–1971 as MOI.
Ahmed Dlimi (CAB1) 1961–1966 then 1970–1973 (DGSN)
Abdelhak Achaachi 1967–1973 (coordinator)
Mohamed Achaachi (Head of counter-subversion unit in the CAB1 during the 1960s)

DST  & DGST
Ahmed Dlimi 1973 – January 1983
Driss Basri January 1983 – 1999
Hamidou Laanigri 1999–2003
Ahmed Harari 2003–2005
Abdellatif Hammouchi 2005–present

Note: In 2005 the DST was renamed DGST.

Notes

References

1973 establishments in Morocco
Government of Morocco
Law enforcement in Morocco
Moroccan intelligence agencies
Government agencies established in 1973
Organizations based in Rabat